Kenneth W. Noe is an American historian whose primary interests are the American Civil War, Appalachia and the American South. He has most recently published The Howling Storm: Weather, Climate, and the American Civil War.
    
Born in Richmond, Virginia in 1957, he grew up in Elliston, Virginia.  He received his B.A. from Emory & Henry College, M.A. from Virginia Tech in 1981, and his Ph.D. from the University of Illinois in 1990. He was a finalist for the Lincoln Prize, and twice a Pulitzer Prize entrant, for his books Perryville: This Grand Havoc of Battle, and The Howling Storm. In 2021 he retired as the Draughon Professor of Southern History at Auburn University in Alabama.

Bibliography
   Pulitzer Prize Entrant, 2020; Gilder Lehrman Lincoln Prize Finalist, 2021
 
 
 
  History Book Club Alternate Selection, 2001; Pulitzer Prize Entrant, 2001; Peter Seaborg Book Award for Civil War Non-Fiction, 2002; Kentucky Governor's Award, 2003
 
 Tennessee History Book Award, 1997

References

External links

Interview with Kenneth W. Noe on ''Reluctant Rebels: The Confederates Who Joined the Army after 1861 
https://kennethwnoe.com

Historians of the American Civil War
Living people
21st-century American historians
21st-century American male writers
1957 births
Emory and Henry College alumni
University of Illinois alumni
Virginia Tech alumni
Auburn University faculty
People from Richmond, Virginia
People from Montgomery County, Virginia
Historians from Virginia
American male non-fiction writers